Mandø is one of the Danish Wadden Sea islands off the southwest coast of Jutland, Denmark in the Wadden Sea, part of the North Sea.

Mandø is barely accessible at high tide over an unpaved surface level causeway of about four kilometers in length that connects the island to the mainland.  Extensive mudflats and tidal marshes encircle the island and provide breeding areas to multitudes of birds and other organisms.  In the past centuries a large earthen dike has been constructed around the perimeter of the island, although substantially set back from the shoreline.  This artifice has allowed conventional farming in the form of grain growing and sheep grazing.  Mandø is technically a hallig, although it is far from the ten German islands commonly described by that term. The name was formerly often spelled Manø.

Logistics of access
Conventional motor vehicles can access Mandø Island via a causeway unpaved roadway, although this route is compromised in storms at high tide. The nearest village on the mainland which is the gateway to Mandø Island is Vester Vedsted.  This simple causeway road is no more than copious gravel laid down on an immense mudflat, with required frequent periodic maintenance of added gravels.  Alternatively many visitors reach the island by way of a specially designed tractor pulled bus with greatly oversized tires.  This vehicle is capable of traversing some of the firmer mudflats, but only at the lowest tides. In any case private vehicles or the "Mandø bus" leave the mainland at the point of the Wadden Sea Centre, which offers nature information and boasts a small museum devoted to the natural history of Mandø. Mandø is located midway between the two larger islands Fanø and Rømø which are connected to the mainland by a ferry and a road running across a causeway, respectively.

Geology and regional setting
Mandø is geographically one of the northernmost islands among the North Frisian Islands off the southwestern Danish and northwestern German coast.<ref>Rand McNally Goode's World Atlas, Editor Edward B. Espenshade, Jr., 18th Ed., Rand McNally, Chicago, Illinois, USA (1986)</ref> The Frisian Islands are generally the line of demarcation separating the North Sea from the Wadden Sea, which is a shallow sea of approximately 5000 square kilometers in size, riddled with small islands and tidal flats.  The entire Wadden Sea area was formed by intervening riverine depositional periods between Ice Age glacier movements.

Ecology
The principal ecosystems on this island are: tidal marsh; mudflat; littoral zone; and upland grassland.  In fact, there is about as much land area in mudflat as the considerable arable land of the island.  Mandø Island is known for its extensive birdlife.  Breeding birds consist of terns, sandpipers, many waders and ducks including eiders.  Mudflats and marshes afford birds a safe and undisturbed location for feeding, resting and breeding.

There are also a variety of insects, marine organisms and small mammals that find habitat on this island.  Many grasses and wildflowers populate the upland portion of the island, in addition to marsh grasses in the intertidal zone. Besides the indigenous wildlife there are sheep which are grazed on the island and along part of the causeway.

History
The first written record of Mandø dates from 1231. The meaning of the original name Mannæø or Mannø is disputed. According to one interpretation the name means the Isle of Men. It has also been interpreted as relating to a burial site for victims of shipwrecks. A number of islands in Sweden have similar names with this meaning.<ref>Politikens Nudansk Ordbog, 15th edition (1992), Copenhagen: Politikens Forlag.''' </ref> A third interpretation explains it as derived from the name Manni.

A local record, Avia Ripensis, mentions the existence of a local church in 1340. The current building dates from 1727. The island belonged to the royal demesne until 1741 when the islanders purchased it at auction. Mandø remains sparsely populated compared to the neighbouring islands, Fanø and Rømø. The census of 1890 records the island's population as 262, a number which has now dwindled to c. 70.

The island has been hit by storm floods on several occasions. A dyke known as Bydiget ('village dyke') was constructed in 1887 east of the main settlement. A second one, Havnediget ('harbour dyke'), was constructed in 1937 protecting the northern part of the island, Gammel Mandø'' ('Old Mandø'). Both dykes were breached in a flood in 1981.

Life on the island was first supported by a combination of agriculture and fishing. Fishing was the responsibility of the island's men and agriculture was managed by the women. The island was later associated with seafaring. In the 20th century, agriculture became the dominant activity. At its peak, the number of farms was 25, a number dwindling to a single one by 1997.

Notable natives 
 Eugenius Warming (1841–1924), recognized as a major founding figure of the scientific discipline of Ecology, was born and lived until about the age of three on the island.
 Villum Kann Rasmussen, (Danish Wiki) (1909–1993), construction engineer and businessman, founder of the roof windows company VELUX, was born and lived in Mandø until 1927 when he moved to Sorø, on Zealand to continue his education. Later in life Rasmussen established various foundations to support social and cultural initiatives, as granting scholarships to inhabitants of Mandø.

See also
Bay mud
Hallig

References

External links

 Synopsis of Mandø Island
 From Vester Vedsted across the UNESCO World Heritage Wadden Sea to Mandø

Tidal islands
Islands of Denmark
Geography of Esbjerg Municipality